USS Eldridge (DE-173), a , was a ship of the United States Navy named for Lieutenant Commander John Eldridge Jr., who led an operation for the invasion of the Solomon Islands.

Namesake
Eldridge was born in Buckingham County, Virginia, on 10 October 1903 and graduated from the United States Naval Academy in 1927. After flight training at Pensacola, Florida, he served at various stations on aviation duty. From 11 September 1941, he was Commander, Scouting Squadron 71, attached to Wasp (CV-7). Lieutenant Commander Eldridge was killed in action in the Solomon Islands on 2 November 1942. For his extraordinary heroism in leading the air attack on Japanese positions in the initial invasion of the Solomons on 7 August and 8 August 1942, he was posthumously awarded the Navy Cross.

Construction
Eldridge was laid down 22 February 1943, by the Federal Shipbuilding and Dry Dock Company in Newark, New Jersey. Eldridge was launched on 25 July 1943, sponsored by Lieutenant Commander Eldridge's widow Mrs. John Eldridge Jr., and commissioned on 27 August 1943.

Service history
Between 4 January 1944 and 9 May 1945, Eldridge sailed on the vital task of escorting, to the Mediterranean Sea, men and materials to support Allied operations in North Africa and on into southern Europe. She made nine voyages to deliver convoys safely to Casablanca, Bizerte, and Oran.

Eldridge departed New York City on 28 May 1945, for service in the Pacific. En route to Saipan in July, she made contact with an underwater object and immediately attacked, but no results were observed. She arrived at Okinawa on 7 August, for local escort and patrol, and with the end of hostilities a week later, continued to serve as escort on the Saipan–Ulithi–Okinawa routes until November. Eldridge was placed out of commission in reserve 17 June 1946.

Leon was decommissioned on 5 November 1992, and on 11 November 1999, was sold as scrap to the Piraeus-based firm V&J Scrapmetal Trading Ltd.

Philadelphia Experiment
The "Philadelphia Experiment" was a purported naval military experiment at the Philadelphia Naval Shipyard in Philadelphia, Pennsylvania, sometime around 28 October 1943, in which Eldridge was to be rendered invisible (i.e. by a cloaking device) to human observers for a brief period. The story is considered a hoax: there is a general lack of evidence for the alleged experiment; the person who started the myth—a merchant seaman named Carl Meredith Allen—admitted that he had made up the story and relayed it to author Morris K. Jessup; and the USS Eldridge's deck log and war diary (preserved on microfilm) show that the ship was never in Philadelphia between August and December 1943.

Awards

American Campaign Medal
European-African-Middle Eastern Campaign Medal
Asiatic-Pacific Campaign Medal
World War II Victory Medal (United States)
Navy Occupation Service Medal with "ASIA" clasp

In popular culture 
The film The Philadelphia Experiment is based on the "Philadelphia Experiment" story and features two sailors aboard the USS Eldridge.

The audio drama podcast ars PARADOXICA works on the premise that the Philadelphia Experiment was conducted, but did not work as intended, instead creating time travel. Because of this, people can only travel back in time towards the place and time the experiment initially occurred, the deck of the USS Eldridge in 1943.

The Doctor Who audio drama, The Macros explores the proposed Philadelphia Experiment as if the ship had entered an alternative dimension but at the loss of its crew.

The USS Eldridge makes a brief appearance in the episode "Journey into Mystery" of the Disney+ series Loki, which is set in the Marvel Cinematic Universe (MCU). The episode suggested that the Philadelphia Experiment was indeed conducted, and the ship was actually teleported to the Void.

References

Bibliography

External links

Cannon-class destroyer escorts of the United States Navy
Conspiracy theories in the United States
Ships built in Kearny, New Jersey
1943 ships
World War II frigates and destroyer escorts of the United States
Wild Beast-class destroyers (1951)